County Kerry was a UK Parliament constituency in Ireland, returning two Members of Parliament. In 1885, it was split into four constituencies.

Boundaries
This constituency comprised the whole of County Kerry, except for the borough of Tralee.

Members of Parliament

Elections

Elections in the 1830s
FitzGerald was appointed as Vice-Treasurer of Ireland, causing a by-election.

Elections in the 1840s

Elections in the 1850s

Browne was appointed Comptroller of the Household, requiring a by-election.

Herbert was appointed Chief Secretary for Ireland, requiring a by-election.

Browne was appointed Treasurer of the Household, requiring a by-election.

Elections in the 1860s

Herbert's death caused a by-election.

Browne was appointed Vice-Chamberlain of the Household, requiring a by-election.

Elections in the 1870s
Browne succeeded as Earl of Kenmare, causing a by-election.

Elections in the 1880s

Split into four divisions in 1885
Under the Redistribution of Seats Act 1885, the single-seat Tralee constituency and the two-seat Kerry constituency were replaced by four single-seat constituencies:

 East Kerry
 North Kerry
 South Kerry
 West Kerry

References

The Parliaments of England by Henry Stooks Smith (1st edition published in three volumes 1844–50), 2nd edition edited (in one volume) by F. W. S. Craig (Political Reference Publications, 1973)
Parliamentary Election Results in Ireland, 1801–1922, edited by B. M. Walker (Royal Irish Academy, 1978)

Westminster constituencies in County Kerry (historic)
Constituencies of the Parliament of the United Kingdom established in 1801
Constituencies of the Parliament of the United Kingdom disestablished in 1885